The 2015 Open 13 was a men's tennis tournament played on indoor hard courts. It was the 22nd edition of the Open 13, and part of the ATP World Tour 250 series of the 2015 ATP World Tour. It took place at the Palais des Sports in Marseille, France, from 16 February through 22 February 2015. Fifth-seeded Gilles Simon won the singles title.

Points and prize money

Point distribution

Prize money

Singles main-draw entrants

Seeds 

 Rankings are as of February 9, 2015.

Other entrants 
The following players received wildcards into the main draw:
 Borna Ćorić
 Gaël Monfils
 Benoît Paire

The following player received entry as a special exempt:
 Luca Vanni

The following players received entry from the qualifying draw:
 David Guez
 Pierre-Hugues Herbert
 Nicolas Mahut
 Alexander Zverev

Withdrawals
Before the tournament
 Julien Benneteau → replaced by Jan-Lennard Struff
 Guillermo García López → replaced by Andrey Golubev
 Richard Gasquet → replaced by Andrey Kuznetsov
 Nick Kyrgios (back injury) → replaced by Sergiy Stakhovsky
 Gilles Müller → replaced by Robin Haase

Retirements
 David Goffin (back pain)
 Pierre-Hugues Herbert (right shoulder injury)
 Paul-Henri Mathieu (stomach illness)

Doubles main-draw entrants

Seeds 

1 Rankings are as of February 9, 2015.

Other entrants 
The following pairs received wildcards into the main draw:
 Hsieh Cheng-peng /  Lee Hsin-han
 Alexander Zverev /  Mischa Zverev

Withdrawals 
During the tournament
 Pierre-Hugues Herbert (right shoulder injury)

Finals

Singles 

  Gilles Simon defeated  Gaël Monfils, 6–4, 1–6, 7–6(7–4)

Doubles 

  Marin Draganja /  Henri Kontinen defeated  Colin Fleming /  Jonathan Marray, 6–4, 3–6, [10–8]

References

External links 
 

Open 13
Open 13